Emperor of America is a novel by Richard Condon published in 1990.  It is a satire about an "Imperial Presidency", poking fun at Ronald Reagan.

Plot summary
A nuclear device explodes in Washington and destroys the White House. The Royalist Party and the National Rifle Association of America are nominally those responsible but Condon's target is Reaganism and its legacy, embodied in the character of an Army colonel, Caesare Appleton, who becomes Emperor Caesare I.

External links
New York Times review

1990 American novels
American satirical novels
Novels by Richard Condon